HMS Smiter is an  patrol and training vessel of the Royal Navy.

Operational history
On being accepted into service, she initially served with the Clyde Division of the Royal Naval Reserve until 11 October 1990. She then transferred to the University Royal Naval Unit (URNU) of Glasgow. In September 2012 she became the training vessel of Oxford University Royal Naval Unit. She replaced  in this role, which transferred to the Faslane Force Protection Squadron.

Role
Smiter provides sea training for members of  Oxford University Royal Naval Unit.

Notes

References

External links

Archer-class patrol vessels
1985 ships